Ariana Luamanu (born 30 June 2002) is a Samoan netball player who represents Samoa internationally and plays in the positions of wing attack and centre. She made her international debut for Samoa at the age of 15 in December 2017.

She made her maiden World Cup appearance representing Samoa at the 2019 Netball World Cup. Ariana was selected into the Samoan squad for the tournament while she was pursuing her high school education at the Geelong Grammar School.

References 

2002 births
Living people
Samoan netball players
2019 Netball World Cup players
People educated at Geelong Grammar School
Australian people of Samoan descent
Australian netball players
Sportspeople from Geelong
Sportswomen from Victoria (Australia)